The North Atlantic Squadron was a section of the United States Navy operating in the North Atlantic. It was renamed as the North Atlantic Fleet in 1902. In 1905 the European and South Atlantic squadrons were abolished and absorbed into the North Atlantic Fleet. On 1 January 1906, the Navy's Atlantic Fleet was established by combining the North Atlantic Fleet with the South Atlantic Squadron.

Commanders-in-Chief

North Atlantic Squadron 
 Commodore/Rear Admiral James S. Palmer 1 November 1865 – 7 December 1867
 Rear Admiral Henry K. Hoff 22 February 1868 – 19 August 1869
 Rear Admiral Charles H. Poor 19 August 1869 – 9 June 1870
 Rear Admiral Samuel Phillips Lee June 1870 – May 1873
 Rear Admiral Gustavus H. Scott May 1873 – 13 June 1874
 Rear Admiral James Robert Madison Mullany 13 June 1874 – January 1876
 Rear Admiral William E. Le Roy January 1876 – September 1876
 Rear Admiral Stephen Decatur Trenchard September 1876 – September 1878
 Rear Admiral John C. Howell September 1878 – January 1879
 Rear Admiral Robert H. Wyman January 1879 – 1 May 1882
 Rear Admiral George H. Cooper 1 May 1882 – 19 June 1884
 Commodore Stephen B. Luce 26 June 1884 – 20 September 1884
 Rear Admiral James E. Jouett 20 September 1884 – June 1886
 Rear Admiral  Stephen B. Luce 18 June 1886 – 28 January 1889
 Rear Admiral Bancroft Gherardi 28 January 1889 – 10 September 1892
 Rear Admiral John G. Walker 10 September 1892 – June 1893
 Rear Admiral Andrew E. K. Benham June 1893 – April 1894
 Rear Admiral Richard W. Meade III April 1894 – May 1895
 Commodore Francis M. Bunce 2 June 1895 – 1 May 1897
 Rear Admiral Montgomery Sicard 1 May 1897 – 28 March 1898
 Rear Admiral William T. Sampson 28 March 1898 – October 1899
 Rear Admiral Norman H. Farquhar October 1899 – 1 May 1901
 Rear Admiral Francis J. Higginson 1 May 1901 – 29 December 1902

North Atlantic Fleet 
 Rear Admiral Francis J. Higginson 29 December 1902 – July 1903
 Rear Admiral Albert S. Barker July 1903 – March 1905
 Rear Admiral Robley D. Evans March 1905 – 1 January 1906

See also 

 Asiatic Squadron
 East India Squadron
 Flying Squadron (United States Navy)
 Home Squadron
 Mediterranean Squadron (United States)
 Pacific Squadron
 West Indies Squadron (United States)

External links 
 Notes on U.S. Fleet Organization and Disposition, 1898–1941
  The U.S. Navy : A Short History

 

Ship squadrons of the United States Navy
1865 establishments in the United States